Beheading the Chinese Prisoner, also known as Beheading a Chinese Prisoner, was a 1900 silent film produced by Siegmund Lubin. The 42-second-long film, which was inspired by news reports of the Boxer Rebellion, was produced on the roof of the Lubin Studios building in Philadelphia.

It is considered an early example of "yellowface", and is featured in Arthur Dong's 2007 documentary film Hollywood Chinese.

Description of the film

Status
A print of Beheading is kept in the George Eastman House International Museum of Photography and Film.

References

1900 films
American silent short films
American black-and-white films
Films set in the Qing dynasty
1900s American films